Toshibumi Tanaka (November 9, 1911 – December 20, 1982) was the first Governor of Hokkaido (1947–1959). He was a graduate of Kyushu University.

References

1911 births
1982 deaths
Japanese politicians
Governors of Hokkaido
Politicians from Aomori Prefecture
Kyushu University alumni
Japanese trade unionists